Four ships of the United States Navy have been named USS Wabash, after the Wabash River of Indiana.

 The first  was a screw frigate in commission from 1856 to 1874, then in use as a receiving ship until 1912.
 The second  was a civilian freighter acquired for Navy use during 1918 and 1919.
 The third  was an oiler in service from 1943 to 1957.
 The fourth  was also an oiler, in service from 1971 to 1994.

United States Navy ship names